Leon Maurice Harden Jr. (August 17, 1947 in Kansas City, Missouri – June 24, 2017) was a defensive back in the National Football League (NFL). 

He played at the University of Texas at El Paso. Harden was drafted by the Green Bay Packers in the eleventh round of the 1969 NFL Draft and played that season with the team.

See also
List of Green Bay Packers players

References

1947 births
Living people
Green Bay Packers players
American football defensive backs
UTEP Miners football players
Players of American football from Kansas City, Missouri